The Professional Footballers' Association Scotland Team of the Year (often called the PFA Scotland Team of the Year, or simply the Team of the Year) is an annual award given to a set of 44 footballers in the four national tiers of the Scottish football league system, who are seen to be deserving of being named in a "Team of the Year". The award is compiled by the members of the players' trade union, Professional Footballers' Association Scotland (PFA Scotland), with the winners then being voted for by the other players in their respective divisions. The award was instituted in the 2006–07 season. In that first season, the award was voted for by the managers in each division.

The award was expanded to include the Scottish Women's Premier League (SWPL) in 2021–22.

Key

Winners

2006–07
Sources

Premier League

First Division

Second Division

Third Division

2007–08

Premier League
Barry Robson played for Dundee United from August 2007 until January 2008, when he transferred to Celtic.

2008–09

Premier League

2009–10

Premier League
Eight Rangers players were selected, along with Andy Webster, who was on loan to Dundee United from Rangers that season.

2010–11
Source

Premier League

2011–12
Sources

Premier League

First Division

Second Division

Third Division

2012–13
Source

Premier League

First Division

Second Division

Third Division

2013–14
Sources

Premiership

Championship

League One

League Two

2014–15
Sources

Premiership
Stuart Armstrong played for Dundee United from August 2014 until February 2015, when he transferred to Celtic.

Championship

League One

League Two

2015–16

Sources

Premiership

Championship

League One

League Two

2016–17

Sources

Premiership

Championship

League One

League Two

2017–18

Sources

Premiership

Championship

League One

League Two

2018–19

Sources

Premiership

Championship

League One

League Two

2019–20
Due to the COVID-19 pandemic, PFA Scotland cancelled their awards for the 2019–20 season.

2020–21
Sources

Premiership

Championship

2021–22
Sources

Premiership

Championship

League One

League Two

SWPL

Footnotes

References

External links
The official website of the Professional Footballers' Association Scotland

Scottish football trophies and awards
Awards established in 2007